Alexander Maximilian Seitz (1811-1888) was a German painter.

Life and work
Seitz studied under Peter von Cornelius, and two early pictures, Joseph sold by his Brethren and the Seven Sleepers, received speedy recognition. Heinrich Maria Hess employed him on the frescoes in the Church of All Saints. After he had painted compositions depicting four of the sacraments, Cornelius took him to Rome.

There Seitz found in Friedrich Overbeck a man of the same religious opinions, with a style which he at once sought to make his own. He aided Overbeck in carrying out the frescoes of the Evangelists and Apostles at Castel Gandolfo, and at a later date, when Overbeck's strength was no longer equal to the task, Seitz, with the aid of his son, Ludwig Seitz, painted frescoes in the cathedral at Diakovar (Djakovo) in Croatia partly according to Overbeck's and partly according to his own designs.

With the help of his son, Seitz painted a cycle of pictures of saints for Herder of Freiburg. Besides some secular compositions, as the genre pictures of the life of the common people at Rome, he treated pre-eminently scenes and persons of the Old and New Testaments. His pictures of the Adoration of the Shepherds, Christ as the Friend of Children, Awakening of the Young Man of Naim, Tribute Money, Jacob and Esau, and The Finding of Moses, are in the spirit of Overbeck.

The St. Anthony, and St. Benedict, as engraved by the Capuchin Bernardo da Monaco, and his Mater Amabilis aroused admiration; an enthroned Madonna went to England. Among his other works are: Translation of St. Catherine to Sinai by angels, and a round picture of Rest on the Flight into Egypt. In this three angels worship Christ, who lies with outstretched arms on the lap of the mother, while at some distance is Joseph with the beast of burden. In the Trinità dei Monti in Rome he painted in fresco the return of the Prodigal son and Christ with heart aflame.

Seitz was one of many who commissioned to paint frescoes for the Metropolitan Cathedral of Athens of the Annunciation (Orthodox Church of Greece).

References

Further reading
 
 "Alexander Maximilian Seitz". In: Hans Vollmer (Ed.): Allgemeines Lexikon der Bildenden Künstler von der Antike bis zur Gegenwart, Vol.30: Scheffel–Siemerding. E. A. Seemann, Leipzig 1936, pg.468.

External links

1811 births
1888 deaths
19th-century German painters
German male painters
19th-century German male artists
Catholic painters